Leroy St Aubin Lugg (born 5 August 1996) is a Jamaican first-class cricketer.

Lugg was born at Kingston in August 1996. He played for the West Indies under-19 cricket team in 2013, making six Youth One Day International appearances during the series. In the opening match, Lugg scored 69 runs, but was disappointed with his performance, considering himself to have not been timing the ball well during his innings. In 2022, he was one of three debutants included in the Jamaica squad for their first two 2021–22 West Indies Championship matches, with Lugg making his debut in first-class cricket against Trinidad and Tobago. He made his Twenty20 debut on 1 September 2022, for Saint Lucia Kings in the 2022 Caribbean Premier League.

References

External links

1996 births
Living people
Cricketers from Kingston, Jamaica
Jamaican cricketers
Jamaica cricketers